Precious Oluoma Nwoke Bichiri (born 16 July 1987 in Abuja) is a Nigerian track and field athlete, who specialized in the 400 metres. Nwoke competed for the women's 4 × 400 m relay at the 2008 Summer Olympics in Beijing, along with her teammates Folashade Abugan, Joy Amechi Eze, and Muizat Ajoke Odumosu. She ran on the third leg of the second heat, with an individual-split time of 51.83 seconds. She and her team finished the relay in fourth place for a seasonal best time of 3:24.10, giving them a qualifying slot for the final round based on performance. By the following day, Nwoke and her team placed seventh in the finals, with another seasonal best time of 3:23.74.

References

External links

NBC 2008 Olympics profile

Nigerian female sprinters
Living people
Olympic athletes of Nigeria
Athletes (track and field) at the 2008 Summer Olympics
1987 births
Olympic female sprinters
People from Abuja
21st-century Nigerian women